Mowers is a surname. Notable people with the surname include:

 Johnny Mowers (1916–1995), Canadian ice hockey goaltender
 Mark Mowers (born 1974), American ice hockey player

See also
 Bowers (surname)